Thomas J. Ward (August 18, 1837 – March 30, 1924) was an American soldier who fought in the American Civil War. Ward received his country's highest award for bravery during combat, the Medal of Honor. Ward's medal was won for his heroism in the Siege of Vicksburg, Mississippi on May 22, 1863. He was honored with the award on July 31, 1896.

Ward was born in Romney, West Virginia, and entered service in Decatur, Illinois. He died at his home in Anaconda, Montana on March 30, 1924, and was buried in Upper Hill Cemetery.

Medal of Honor citation

See also
List of American Civil War Medal of Honor recipients: T–Z

References

External links
 

1837 births
1924 deaths
American Civil War recipients of the Medal of Honor
People from Romney, West Virginia
People of West Virginia in the American Civil War
Union Army soldiers
United States Army Medal of Honor recipients
Military personnel from West Virginia
People from Anaconda, Montana